Polyphonte (Ancient Greek:  means 'slayer of many') is a character in Greek mythology, transformed into a strix.

Family 
Polyphonte was the daughter of Hipponous and Thrassa; her grandparents on her mother's side were the war god Ares and Tereine, a daughter of the river god Strymon.

Mythology
The story of her life is contained in only one source, namely Antoninus Liberalis's Metamorphoses. Antonius cites Boeus’ second book, ‘The Origin of Birds’ as the source of the story; however, Boeus’ work has been lost.

Wrath of Aphrodite 
Wishing to remain a virgin, Polyphonte fled to the mountains to become a companion of Artemis. This provoked the ire of Aphrodite, the goddess of love and procreation, who viewed Polyphonte's decision as a personal affront. To punish Polyphonte for failing to honor her womanly duty, Aphrodite drove her mad and caused her to lust after a bear.

Artemis was disgusted with Polyphonte and so turned the wild animals against her. Fearing for her life, Polyphonte was forced to return to her father's home.

Birth of the bear twins
Once at home, Polyphonte gave birth to two humanoid bear-like sons, Agrius and Oreius (the result of her union with the bear). Agrius and Oreius grew into huge men of immense strength. As perhaps befits their feral patronage, the Bear Twins honored neither men nor gods. Indeed, they were cannibals who attacked strangers on the road.

Zeus despised Agrius and Oreius and so sent Hermes to punish them as he saw fit. The brothers almost had their hands and feet severed by the vengeful god were it not for the intervention of their great-grandfather Ares. Despite their monstrous nature, Ares persuaded Hermes to commute the sentence. Together, Hermes and Ares transformed Agrius, Oreius, Polyphonte, and the family's female servant into birds. Polyphonte was transformed into the owl-like strix, which neither ate nor drank and cried during that night, which portended war and sedition for mankind. As for her sons, Oreius was turned into a "bird called lagōs" (hypothetically translated as an "eagle owl") regarded as ill omen, and Agrius was turned into a vulture, a despised carrion-eating bird. In a small act of mercy, Ares and Hermes heeded the female servant's prayer where she had no involvement in the Bear Twins' actions and decided not to transform her into a bird heralding evil for mankind. Instead, she was transformed into a woodpecker (supposedly a sign of good luck if seen before a hunt).

Parallels to other stories
The story bears strong similarities with the tales of Hippolytus, Atalanta and Callisto. It has been suggested that all these tales deal with the function of Artemis within the rituals of Ancient Greece and shed light on how they saw a woman's first sexual encounter. In so far as the tale details bestiality as a punishment for offending the gods, the myth is also similar to that of Pasiphaë and the Minotaur where Pasiphaë mated with a bull resulting in the Minotaur's birth.

French folklorist Paul Delarue listed this story as an ancient parallel to the European tale of Jean de l'Ours, a strong hero born of a human woman and a bear.

Explanatory notes

Notes

References 

 

Women in Greek mythology
Metamorphoses into birds in Greek mythology
Deeds of Artemis
Deeds of Zeus
Deeds of Aphrodite
Retinue of Artemis
Deeds of Hermes
Deeds of Ares